Monforte d'Alba is a comune (municipality) in the Province of Cuneo in the Italian region Piedmont, located about  southeast of Turin and about  northeast of Cuneo.

Monforte d'Alba borders the following municipalities: Barolo, Castiglione Falletto, Dogliani, Monchiero, Novello, Roddino, and Serralunga d'Alba.

Monforte d'Alba is part of the zone of the  Barolo wine production area.

References 

Cities and towns in Piedmont